Pan Lei (4 August 1927 - 22 July 2017) was a film director and writer.

Biography
Pan Lei was born in Vietnam. He died in Taiwan.

Filmography
 1984: Woman of Colour
 1981: The Tattoo
 1980: Strange Story of Crematory 
 1978: The Adventure of the "Heaven Mouse"
 1977: The Crooks
 1975: Cuties Parade
 1975: Evil Seducers
 1975: Love Lock
 1972: It All Started with a Bed
 1972: Funny Girl
 1971: The Sword
 1971: The Merciful Sword
 1970: Love Without End
 1969: Purple Darts
 1969: Tomorrow Is Another Day
 1969: Devil Fighter
 1968: The Wolf and the Angel
 1968: The Fastest Sword
 1968: Fallen Petals
 1967: The Purple Shell
 1966: Poison Rose
 1966: Downhill They Ride
 1965: Song of Orchid Island
 1964: Lovers' Rock
 1962: Typhoon
 1960: The Golden Age
 1959: On Mount Hehuan

Further reading

External links

 HKMDB entry
 HK Cinemagic entry
 hkfilmdirectors.com entry

1927 births
2017 deaths
Taiwanese film directors